Kokardine is a locality in the Wheatbelt region of Western Australia, northwest of Koorda. It is located within the Shire of Wongan-Ballidu.

The name Kokardine, which may mean "water in the grass", is derived from the Aboriginal name of a nearby soak, first recorded by a surveyor in 1892.

History
In 1927, with the Ejanding North railway under construction between the towns now known as Amery and Kalannie, the Wongan Hills road board asked that a townsite be set aside at the siding and place later named Kokardine.  The townsite was gazetted in 1929.

See also
 CBH class – a class of locomotive, one of which is named after the locality

References

Wheatbelt (Western Australia)